Piaget may refer to:

People with the surname 
 Édouard Piaget (18171910), a Swiss entomologist
 Jean Piaget (18961980), a Swiss developmental psychologist
 Paul Piaget (disambiguation), several people
 Solange Piaget Knowles (born 1986), an American recording artist, actress, model and DJ

Other uses 
 Piaget's theory of cognitive development, a theory about the nature and development of human intelligence
 Piaget SA, a Swiss watchmaker and jeweler
 Piaget Building, a building in New York City, United States of America
 Jean Piaget University of Angola, a university in based in Luanda, Angola
 Jean Piaget University of Cape Verde, a university in Praia, Cape Verde, with a smaller second location in Mindelo, Cape Verde
 Instituto Piaget, a Portuguese private institution of higher education
 Piaget Belgian Open, a former men's golf tournament in Belgium

See also 
 Paget, a surname

Surnames of Swiss origin
Swiss-language surnames
French-language surnames